Diplopogon is a genus of Australian plants in the grass family. It was first described in 1810 by Robert Brown.  it contains only a singles species, Diplopogon setaceus, found in southwestern Australia. It is similar to the genus Amphipogon, the only difference being the awns of the lemma.

It grows in seasonally wet areas, swamps, and fringing watercourses from Nannup to Albany. It flowers in spring and early summer in a greyish head of multiple spikelets.

References

Arundinoideae
Monotypic Poaceae genera
Endemic flora of Australia